Vipulanantha College ( Vipulānantā Kallūri) is a provincial school in Vavuniya, Sri Lanka.

See also
 List of schools in Northern Province, Sri Lanka

References

External links
 Vipulanantha College

Provincial schools in Sri Lanka
Schools in Vavuniya